Haide is a hamlet in the municipality of Mohlsdorf-Teichwolframsdorf in the Greiz district of Thuringia, southwest of the hamlet Gottesgrün, located on the Neumark–Greiz railway. The residential area consists of two farmsteads and three other residential buildings.

References

Greiz (district)